Henry Russell Walter (born April 23, 1986), known professionally as Cirkut, is a Canadian record producer and songwriter. He has co-produced and co-written for Dr. Luke, Katy Perry, Becky G, Ava Max, Nicki Minaj, R. City, The Weeknd, Kesha, Ciara, Pitbull, Britney Spears, Ne-Yo, Rihanna, Adam Lambert, B.o.B, Marina and the Diamonds, will.i.am, G.R.L. and Juicy J among others. Songs he has written and produced include the Billboard Hot 100 No. 1 singles "Part of Me", "Roar" and "Dark Horse" by Katy Perry, and "Wrecking Ball" by Miley Cyrus. His production credits on The Weeknd's album Starboy won him the 2018 Grammy Award for Best Urban Contemporary Album. His most recent collaboration was on Ava Max's second studio album Diamonds & Dancefloors (2023).

Life and career
Walter was raised in Halifax, Nova Scotia and moved to Toronto in 2004. He co-produced the Britney Spears song "Mmm Papi" which appeared on her 2008 album Circus. He sent it as an instrumental track to Kobalt Music Group via their attorney Chris Taylor, where songwriter Nicole Morier began using it to write with Britney Spears.

Walter opened Dream House Studios in Toronto. He then relocated to Los Angeles, California. He co-produced "Part of Me", the title song to Katy Perry's 2012 concert film Katy Perry: Part of Me. Walter was also responsible for producing and co-writing The Weeknd's track "High for This". In 2016, he co-produced and co-wrote 9 songs on The Weeknd's album Starboy.

Discography

Awards and nominations
 Grammy Awards

|-
! scope="row" | 
| "Roar"
| Song of the Year
| 
|-
! scope="row" | 
| Starboy
| Best Urban Contemporary Album
| 
|-
! scope="row" | 
| Donda
| Album of the Year
| 

 Juno Awards
 2014: Jack Richardson Producer of the Year (Won)
 2015: Songwriter of the Year (Nominated)

References

Further reading
 Adam Lamberts Blog
 Thread about Adam Lambert

External links
 
 Dream House Studios
 The Dream Machine Music website
 Dream Machine Publishing 
 Prescription Songs

Canadian record producers
Canadian songwriters
Grammy Award winners
Jack Richardson Producer of the Year Award winners
Living people
Musicians from Halifax, Nova Scotia
1986 births